The Greater Yosemite Council (#059) is a local council of the Boy Scouts of America based in Modesto, California. It was founded in 1920 as the Modesto Council. In 1921 Modesto changed its name to the Stanislaus County Council, and in 1922 to the Yosemite Area. In 1998, the council changed its name to the Greater Yosemite Council. In 1997, the Forty Niner Council (#052) merged with the Yosemite Area Council.

The Forty Niner Council was founded in 1918 as the Stockton Council. In 1922 Stockton changed its name to San Joaquin, and in 1929 to San Joaquin-Calaveras Council.  In 1957, San Joaquin-Calaveras Council changed its name to Forty Niner Council.

Organization

The council reorganized eight districts into three in 2011. The 49er District. Calaveras District, and the Big Valley District were combined into the Gold Country District. The  Chief Tenaya District and the Golden Heritage District, and Waukeen District formed the Sierra Valley District. The El Capitan District and the Wawona District became the Rio Del Oro District.

Camps

Camp John Mensinger
Camp McConnell

Former camps
Camp Micke, near Lodi (operated by Stockton Council)
Camp Cowell, near Santa Cruz (operated by San Joaquin-Calaveras Council)
Camp Dorrington, near Arnold (operated by San Joaquin-Calaveras Council)
Camp Baxter, near Arnold (operated by San Joaquin-Calaveras Council)
Camp Paradise, previous name of Camp 49 (operated by 49er Council)
Camp 49er, near Avery CA. (operated by 49er Council)
Camp Bob MacBride, east side of Pinecrest Lake (operated by Yosemite Area Council)
Camp Minkalo, in Amador County (operated by 49er Council)
Camp Hi-Sierra, near Silver Lake in Amador County (operated by 49er Council)

Order of the Arrow

Toloma Lodge #64

See also

Scouting in California

References

Boy Scout councils in California
Modesto, California
1920 establishments in California